The women's tournament of volleyball at the 2019 Pan American Games in Lima, Peru will take place from 7 August to 11 August. All games are held at the Callao Sports Center. The defending champions are the United States.

Qualification
A total of eight teams qualified to compete at the games.

Results

Preliminary round

Group A

Group B

Placement 5th–8th

7th–8th place match

5th–6th place match

Placement 1st–4th

Semifinals

Bronze medal match

Gold medal match

Final standings

Awards

Most Valuable Player

Best Setter

Best Outside Hitters

Best Middle Blockers

Best Opposite

Best Libero

References 

Volleyball at the 2019 Pan American Games
Pan American Games - Women